Athena Leads the Young Warrior into the Fight (German: Der Jüngling wird von Athena in neuen Kampf geführt) is an 1853 sculpture by Albert Wolff, installed on Schlossbrücke in Berlin, Germany.

See also

 1853 in art
 Greek mythology in popular culture

References

External links
 

1853 establishments in Germany
1853 sculptures
Ancient Greece in art and culture
Nude sculptures in Germany
Outdoor sculptures in Berlin
Sculptures of Athena
Sculptures of men in Germany
Statues in Germany